DXBC stands for:

 DXBC-AM, an AM station of Radio Mindanao Network broadcasting in Butuan
 DXBC-FM, an FM station of ABS-CBN Broadcasting Corporation broadcasting in General Santos